Magnesium pyridoxal 5-phosphate glutamate (trade name Sedalipid) is a hypolipidemic agent.

References

Hypolipidemic agents